Davis Ford is an unincorporated community on the Cacapon River in Hampshire County in the U.S. state of West Virginia. It lies primarily on Cacapon River Road (West Virginia Secondary Route 14) at the ford from which it takes its name. The Yellow Spring post office serves the Davis Ford community.

References

Unincorporated communities in Hampshire County, West Virginia
Unincorporated communities in West Virginia